Jonathan P. How is a Canadian-American astrophysicist and aeronautical engineer currently the Richard Cockburn Maclaurin Professor at Massachusetts Institute of Technology and Editor-in-Chief of the IEEE Control Systems Magazine, also previously a Davis Faculty Scholar at Stanford University. His current concerns are technology systems engineering and space engineering.

How was born in England in 1965. He moved to Canada and attended the University of Toronto, earning his college degree in engineering. He moved to the Massachusetts Institute of Technology (MIT) for graduate. He also earned his Doctorate of Philosophy (often called a Ph.D.) at MIT too. After getting his doctorate, he became a professor at Stanford, having moved to California. In 2000, he moved to MIT and is now a professor there.

How is director of the Ford-MIT Alliance. In terms of editorships, he is Editor-In-Chief of IEEE Control Systems Magazine and one of the associate editors for Journal of Aerospace Information Systems of AIAA. He was also on the Scientific Advisory Board (SAB) for the United States Air Force.

Awards
How has won multiple AIAA Best Paper in Conference Awards, including those of 2011, 2012, and 2013. Additionally in 2011, he earned the IFAC Automatica award for best applications paper. He received the 2002 Institute of Navigation Burka Award. In 2015, How won the AeroLion Technologies Outstanding Paper Award for the Journal Unmanned Systems. In 2016, How was named a Fellow of the American Institute of Aeronautics and Astronautics and two years later was became a Fellow of the Institute of Electrical and Electronics Engineers (IEEE). In 2021, How was elected a member of the National Academy of Engineering for contributions to decision making and control of intelligent autonomous aerospace vehicles.

References

20th-century births
Living people
Canadian physicists
University of Toronto alumni
Massachusetts Institute of Technology alumni
Stanford University faculty
MIT School of Engineering faculty
Fellow Members of the IEEE
21st-century American physicists
Year of birth missing (living people)
Place of birth missing (living people)